Woody Abernathy may refer to:

 Woody Abernathy (pitcher) (1915–1994), American Major League Baseball player
 Woody Abernathy (outfielder) (1908–1961), minor league baseball player